Bryan Michael Deece Cassidy (born 17 February 1934) is a former British politician, who served in the European Parliament.

Cassidy was educated at Ratcliffe College and then Sidney Sussex College, Cambridge.  He served as director of a trade association, and became active in the Conservative Party, unsuccessfully contesting Wandsworth Central at the 1966 general election.  From 1977 until 1986, he served on the Greater London Council.

At the 1984 European Parliament election, Cassidy was elected to represent Dorset East and Hampshire West, serving until 1994, when he was elected for Dorset and East Devon.  He stood for the enlarged seat of South West England at the 1999 European Parliament election, but was not elected.

References

1934 births
Living people
Members of the Greater London Council
MEPs for England 1984–1989
MEPs for England 1989–1994
MEPs for England 1994–1999
Conservative Party (UK) MEPs